The Argentine Interconnection System (Spanish: Sistema Argentino de Interconexión, SADI) is a wide area synchronous grid that links the regional networks of all Argentinian provinces, with the exception of Tierra del Fuego. It is also connected to the power grids of several neighboring countries.

These power lines are operated by Transener.

History 
The interconnection system began by including transmission lines and substations built by AyEE, HIDRONOR and others constructed by private initiative. Those lines primarily linked the generation centers distributed along the country with the major consumption center in the Greater Buenos Aires area.

In 1947, the General Direction of Water and Electric Power was created by presidential decree, with the task of planning, construction and operation of electrical power plants, transmission lines and substations.

In 1960, Act 15336 (Electric Energy Law) is approved, recognizing a "National Interconnection Network" that would integrate all the country's regional networks. This would change the jurisdiction of those networks from a provincial to a national control. This new national network would be controlled by a new organism to be created, the Federal Council of Electric Power, under the national Energy & Fuel Secretary structure.

This new organism would have representatives of the central government as well as the provinces and the City of Buenos Aires, intending to unify criteria and not only satisfy the interests of Buenos Aires.

In 1991, the State Reform law brought privatization for the energy companies, creating a new regulatory framework for the energy and utilities sector. This would be included in the 24065 Act, which created the Wholesale Energy Market and the National Electricity Regulatory Entity (ENRE). It also creates a new public entity to regulate the Interconnection, the National Cargoes Dispatch (DNDC), which would incorporate in 1002 in the form of a sociedad anónima (a private corporation) with the name Compañía Administradora del Mercado Mayorista Eléctrico Sociedad Anónima (CAMMESA).

Main figures 
According to the 2019 annual report by CAMMESA, that year the network showed the following figures:

International links 
The system connects to several neighboring countries:

 Argentina–Chile
 Interandes: TermoAndes – Chilgener (from 2001 on, AES TermoAndes)
 Paraguay–Argentina
 Carlos Antonio López (Paraguay) –  Eldorado (Argentina). 132 kV
 Guarambaré (Paraguay) – Clorinda (Argentina). 220 kV
 Argentina–Uruguay
 Salto Grande Dam (1.890 MW power station)
 Argentina–Brasil
 Paso de los Libres – Uruguaiana (50 MW line)
 Rincón – Garabi – Ita I
 Rincón – Garabi – Ita II

2019 Blackout 

On 16 June 2019, a large-scale power outage struck most of Argentina, all of Uruguay, and parts of Paraguay. It was caused by an operational misbehavior from Transener, a transmission lines operator in Argentina.

A short circuit which lowered demand, caused an excess of power generation in the grid, a lack of synchronization of power plants, loss of balance, and a low frequency in the network, triggering massive automatic disconnections from the grid. This caused a blackout that, in a matter of 30 seconds, came to affect 50 million users in the continent.

References 

Electric power in Argentina
Electric power transmission systems in Argentina
Electric power infrastructure in Argentina
Electric power transmission systems in South America
Wide area synchronous grids